William Telek (January 6, 1924 – May 17, 1988) was a Republican member of the Pennsylvania House of Representatives. He joined the state House in 1979.

Telek was found beaten to death on a street in Susquehanna Township, Pennsylvania in May 1988. He had been robbed and beaten with a hammer; his car was found eight hours later being driven by Bernard Williams, who was subsequently convicted of the murder. The killer was sentenced to life in prison, and his conviction was upheld by the Pennsylvania Superior Court after an appeal.

Telek's widow, Leona, was elected in November 1988 to fill her husband's District seat.

References

Deaths by beating in the United States
Republican Party members of the Pennsylvania House of Representatives
People murdered in Pennsylvania
1988 deaths
1924 births
20th-century American politicians
People from Westmoreland County, Pennsylvania